African rock gecko may refer to the two African gecko species below:
Afroedura africana
Afroedura tirasensis

Animal common name disambiguation pages